Pierre Blanchard (born 14 January 1945) is a French sailor who competed in the 1968 Summer Olympics.

References

1945 births
Living people
French male sailors (sport)
Olympic sailors of France
Sailors at the 1968 Summer Olympics – Dragon
20th-century French people